Luke Wypler (born May 3, 2001) is an American football center for the Ohio State Buckeyes.

Early life and high school career
Wypler was born on May 3, 2001. He grew up in Ho-Ho-Kus, New Jersey, and attended Saint Joseph Regional High School. Wypler committed to play college football for the Buckeyes at Ohio State University.

College career
Wypler played in one game during his true freshman season at Ohio State before redshirting the season. He was named the Buckeyes starting center entering his redshirt freshman season. Wypler started 13 games and an honorable mention on the 2021 All-Big Ten team. He was named third-team All-Big Ten as a redshirt sophomore.

References

External links 
 Ohio State Buckeyes bio

2001 births
Living people
American football centers
Ohio State Buckeyes football players
People from Ho-Ho-Kus, New Jersey
Players of American football from New Jersey
Saint Joseph Regional High School alumni
Sportspeople from Bergen County, New Jersey